St Catharine's Church, Nottingham, was a parish church in the Church of England in Nottingham.

History

The ecclesiastical parish was formed in 1884 out of the parishes of St Mary, St Mark, St Luke and St Paul. The foundation stone for St Catharine's was laid on 23 July 1895 and built to designs of the architect Robert Charles Clarke. It was situated on the St Ann's Well Road.

The church was consecrated on 26 November 1896. It was built, in the Early English style, of Bulwell stone with Bath stone dressings, and consisted of chancel, nave, south chapel and a bell turret.  The living was a vicarage in the gift of the Bishop of Southwell.

On 16 August 1946 a fire damaged part of the roof of the church and vestry. Due to the post war restrictions on building materials, it was not until May 1947 that the church received a licence to repair the roof.

St Catharine's was declared redundant in 1980 but united with St Mary's Church, Nottingham, and services continued until 2003. The church was then sold by the Diocese of Southwell and Nottingham. Christ-Citadel International Church acquired the building in 2007.

Incumbents

1883 Selwyn Charles Freer
1889 Sidney Thorold Winkley
1894 Claud E. Lewis
1904 Arthur Wells Hopkinson
1909 Edward Huntly Gordon
1914 John Michael Fyvie Lester
1933 Wallace Frederick Carlile Clark
1937 John Buchanan Fraser
1945 Henry Maurice Jenkins
1955 Robert Ross Somervell
1958 Norman Patterson Thompson
1964 David Peter Keene
1971 Roland Douglas Seager (Priest in Charge)
1974 Peter Tennant Miller (Priest in Charge)

Organ
The first organ was destroyed in a fire in 1946. A second organ by Augustus Gern was acquired from Tockington Manor in 1948 and was installed by Roger Yates. This organ was sold to St Peter and St Paul's Church, Shelford, Notts, in 2003, when St Catharine's closed.

Sources
Sidney Robinson: The Organ of the Parish Church of St. Catharine's, Nottingham. 1946
Southwell and Nottingham Church History Project - Nottingham St Catharine - History

References

External links
See St. Catharine's Church on Google Street View

Nottingham St Catharine
Churches completed in 1896
19th-century Church of England church buildings
Nottingham St Catharine
Nottingham